The Story of Sir Launcelot and His Companions is a 1907 novel by the American illustrator and writer Howard Pyle. The book consists of a large series of episodes in the legend of the chief knight of the Round Table, Sir Launcelot, and many of his friends, including the Lady Elaine, Sir Ewaine, and Sir Gareth.

Plot

The Chevalier of the Cart
Queen Guinevere and others of the court are captured by Sir Mellegrans. Sir Lancelot, while going to save her, loses his horse due to attacking archers. His armor is too heavy to walk in, so he leaves it behind. The fastest option for Lancelot to reach Mellegrans' castle is to ride in a cart, causing much shame to him. Lancelot is successful in saving Guinevere, but continues to be ridiculed for riding in the cart. Annoyed, he leaves the court of the king for two years.

The Story of Sir Gareth of Orkney
Gareth is the youthful and beloved son of King Lot of Orkney and Queen Margaise. Now being of a certain age, his mother sends him to the court of her brother, King Arthur, to become a knight. With him she sends a very noble court to show his great status. Gareth, at first being content, decides he would rather appear as a commoner before the king. Thus he leaves everyone of his court behind except his closest companion, Axatalese. Gareth asks two boons of the king during Pentecost, and it is that he would be able to stay at the court for a year, and be able to ask another boon after one year. He is granted his wish, however, many found it strange. Sir Kay ridicules Gareth, frequently calling him "kitchen boy" and "Beaumains." Sir Gawaine, however, feels a connection with Gareth (though he did not realize it at the time, Gareth was in fact his brother). He teaches Gareth lessons in chivalry. A year soon passes, and the king holds another feast at Pentecost. During this feast, a damsel named Lynette requests from the king a knight who would help defend her sister (who she does not name, by her sister's command) from a Red Knight who pesters her for her hand in marriage. Because the Red Knight is known to be very powerful—even Sir Gawaine claimed he had trouble overthrowing him—and because Lynette will not state her sister's name and degree, no knight offers to help. Gareth, overhearing and onlooking the scene, steps in and asks his second boon: that he may help Lynette's sister. Lynette is ungrateful, for Gareth appears to be no more than just a simple fellow, and his reputation is very bad at court. However, since she is not given any other option, she travels to her home with Gareth and Axatalese to help her. Gareth shows her that he is more than just "Beaumains the kitchen boy" by overthrowing many knights valorously—even Sir Lancelot, who knighted him after the battle. When Gareth beholds Lynette's sister, the Lady Layonnesse, he becomes infatuated with her beauty. He is victorious in his battle with the Red Knight. Not long after, he becomes a Knight of the Round Table and marries Layonnesse.

The Story of Launcelot and Elaine the Fair

The Madness of Lancelot

The Story of Sir Ewaine and the Lady of the Fountain

The Return of Sir Launcelot

The Nativity of Galahad

External links

The Story of Sir Launcelot and His Companions at the Internet Archive

1907 American novels
1907 children's books
1907 fantasy novels
American children's novels
Arthurian literature in English
Children's historical novels
King Arthur and the Knights of the Round Table series
Novels by Howard Pyle